Pornpimol Thammasan (nicknamed Koy, born April 11, 1968 in Lampang, Thailand) is a Thai singer, politician and businesswoman of Chinese descent. She is known for the original version, in Thai language, of a 1995 song Broken Hearted Woman by Jessica Jay

Biography
Koy was born in city of Lampang, near Chiang Mai, however she was educated in Bangkok since she was young. She was invited to join The Ovation band in 1987 as a lead singer, replacing former lead singer  who became a solo singer after. Later, in 1989, she also left The Ovation and became a solo singer. Her last known work in music career was in 1995.

Her husband is a politician in Pathum Thani Province, which then in 2007 she was elected to be a House of Representatives member in the same province, in People's Power Party, which then moved to Pheu Thai Party in 2011. She also owns three restaurants in Pathum Thani. In 2019, She was elected to Pathum Thani 3rd district during the 2019 Thai general election.

References 

Pornpimol Thammasan
Pornpimol Thammasan
Pornpimol Thammasan
Pornpimol Thammasan
Pornpimol Thammasan
1968 births
Living people
Pornpimol Thammasan